Denis Allen may refer to:

 Denis Allen (politician) (1896–1961), Irish Fianna Fáil TD for Wexford
 Denis Allen (singer), singer/songwriter based in County Limerick, Ireland
 Dinny Allen (born 1952), Cork Gaelic footballer

See also
 Dennis Allen (disambiguation)
Allen (surname)